Trerwanwala is a village of Tehsil Kharian, Gujrat District, Punjab, Pakistan, located on the road from Dinga to Lalamusa. Farming is the main source of income from within the village, with many land owners. Outside of this many residents have settled abroad in the UK or Europe.Its neighbouring village is dhndhala. 

Populated places in Gujrat District